John Everett was an English painter.

John Everett may also refer to:

 John Everett (rower) (born 1954), American Olympic rower
 John Everett (rugby union) (born 1957), American rugby union player

See also
 John Everet, highwayman in Everet v Williams, 1700s English court case about contracts to commit crimes
 John Everett-Heath, British author, former civil servant, and Fellow of the Royal Geographical Society
 John Everett Lyle Streight (1880–1955), Canadian lumber merchant, military officer and politician
 John Everett Millais (1829–1896), English painter and illustrator
 John Everett Robbins (1903–1995), Canadian educator and encyclopedia editor
 John Everetts (1873–1956), United States Navy sailor